Max Olivier-Lacamp (March 2, 1914 Le Havre – June 17, 1983 Meudon) is a French journalist and writer, winner of the Prix Renaudot in 1969, and Albert Londres Prize in 1958.

Biography 
Max Olivier, also known as Max-Olivier Lacamp, was a reporter for Le Figaro and reported on the Partition of India, in 1947. His book, Between the two Asias, is devoted to the difference between Asian Indian and Far East.

Family
He lived in Korea, and married a Korean.
He is the father of the writer Ysabelle Lacamp.

Works
 Les Feux de la colère, Bernard Grasset, 1969, Prix Renaudot.
 Le Kief, B. Grasset, 1974, 
 Le matin calme : Corée d'hier et d'aujourd'hui , Stock, 1977, 
 Les chemins de Montvézy, Grasset, 1981,

References

External links
http://www.corbisimages.com/stock-photo/rights-managed/0000214500-001/french-writer-maxolivier-lacamp

1914 births
1983 deaths
Prix Renaudot winners
Albert Londres Prize recipients
Writers from Le Havre
French male non-fiction writers
20th-century French male writers